The Rhizinaceae are a family of ascomycete fungi in the order Pezizales. The family was circumscribed by German mycologist Hermann Friedrich Bonorden in 1851.

References

External links

Ascomycota families
Pezizales